Christine Ann Donisthorpe (née Benes; May 31, 1932 - July 23, 2017) was an American politician who was a Democratic member of the New Mexico State Senate from 1979 to 1996. She attended the University of Montana and San Juan College and worked in real estate. She was also chairwoman of the Bloomfield School Board from 1975 to 1981. Along with her husband, Oscar, she was also an alfalfa hay farmer near Bloomfield, New Mexico.

References

1932 births
2017 deaths
People from Fergus County, Montana
University of Montana alumni
Businesspeople from New Mexico
School board members in New Mexico
Women state legislators in New Mexico
Democratic Party New Mexico state senators
21st-century American women